Obaagun is an ancient town of Yoruba land The town is begin headed by Oba Adebisi Okunade (Kayode ii) and it is one of the few most ancient towns of Yoruba Republic of Nigeria, Benin and Togo. Obaagun is a valley Town in Osun State. It is surrounded by many towns and among them is Ikirun, Iragbiji, Iba, Iree,Ada and Inisha.

Location
The entire Obaagun land is located in the North-East of Osun State and in Latitude 7 degree 50ft North of Equator and Longitude 4 degree 40ft East of Greenwich Meridian.It is found in the tropical rain forest of Southern Nigeria.

References

Populated places in Osun State
Towns in Yorubaland